Euglossa jacquelynae is a Euglossine bee species found in Central Brazil.

References

Further reading
Giangarelli, D. C., and S. H. Sofia. "First record of the orchid bee Euglossa viridis (Perty)(Hymenoptera, Apidae, Euglossini) from Paraná State, southern Brazil." Brazilian Journal of Biology 71.1 (2011): 223-223.
Ferreira, Paulo Emílio, Rafael Fosca Freitas, and Solange Cristina Augusto. "Diversidade de Euglossini (Hymenoptera: Apidae) em áreas de cerrado do triângulo mineiro, MG." Bioscience Journal 23 (2007).
Freitas, Rafael Fosca de. "Diversidade e sazonalidade de abelhas Euglossini Latreille (Hymenoptera: Apidae) em fitofisionomias do bioma Cerrado em Uberlândia, MG." (2009).

External links

jacquelynae
Endemic fauna of Brazil
Hymenoptera of South America
Hymenoptera of Brazil
Insects described in 2007
Orchid pollinators